Sclerotinia trifoliorum is a plant pathogen infecting alfalfa, red clover, chickpea, and fava bean. Lithourgidis et al. have done much work on this disease and fava bean.

References

External links 
 Index Fungorum
 USDA ARS Fungal Database

Fungal plant pathogens and diseases
Sclerotiniaceae
Fungi described in 1880